A movement is a self-contained part of a musical composition or musical form. While individual or selected movements from a composition are sometimes performed separately as stand-alone pieces, a performance of the complete work requires all the movements to be performed in succession. A movement is a section, "a major structural unit perceived as the result of the coincidence of relatively large numbers of structural phenomena".

Sources

Formal sections in music analysis